The Minister for the Police Force was a position in the Luxembourgian cabinet.  The Minister for the Police Force shared responsibilities for law and order with the Minister for Justice.

The position of Minister for the Police Force was created on 6 February 1969, with the role going first to Eugène Schaus.  The role remained unchanged until it was scrapped on 7 August 1999, with its responsibilities folded into those of the Minister for the Interior.

List of Ministers for the Police Force

Footnotes

References
 
  

 List
Police Force, Minister for